Stjärnhov is a locality situated in Gnesta Municipality, Södermanland County, Sweden with 549 inhabitants in 2010.

Riksdag elections

References 

Populated places in Södermanland County
Populated places in Gnesta Municipality